Zygfryd Blaut (2 March 1943 – 20 April 2005) was a Polish football player who won two titles with Legia Warsaw. He also played in one international match for Poland, against Iraq.

Blaut was born in Gogolin. His older brother Bernard died on 19 May 2007.

He had his most successful spell with Legia Warsaw between 1969 and 1973, winning a Polish cup. During a tour of Spain and South America in 1971-72 he sustained an injury which severely hampered his progress.

References

Legia Warsaw players
Polish footballers
1943 births
2005 deaths
Poland international footballers
Place of death missing
People from Krapkowice County
Polish football managers
Odra Opole managers
Sportspeople from Opole Voivodeship
Association football defenders